In geometry, the metabidiminished rhombicosidodecahedron is one of the Johnson solids.

It can be constructed as a rhombicosidodecahedron with two non-opposing pentagonal cupolae removed.
Related Johnson solids are:
 The diminished rhombicosidodecahedron where one cupola is removed,
 The parabidiminished rhombicosidodecahedron where two opposing cupolae are removed,
 The gyrate bidiminished rhombicosidodecahedron where two non-opposing cupolae are removed and a third is rotated 36 degrees, 
 And the tridiminished rhombicosidodecahedron where three cupolae are removed.

External links
 

Johnson solids